The 1994 Surabaya Women's Open, also known as the Digital Open,  was a women's tennis tournament played on outdoor hard courts at the Embong Sawo Sports Club in Surabaya, Indonesia that was part of Tier IV of the 1994 WTA Tour. It was the inaugural edition of the tournament and was held from 7 November until 13 November 1994. Unseeded  Elena Wagner won the singles title and earned $18,000 first-prize money.

Finals

Singles

 Elena Wagner defeated  Ai Sugiyama 2–6, 6–0, retired
 It was Wagner's only singles title of her career.

Doubles

 Yayuk Basuki /  Romana Tedjakusuma defeated  Kyōko Nagatsuka /  Ai Sugiyama walkover
 It was Basuki's 1st doubles title of the year and the 3rd of her career. It was Tedjakusuma's only doubles title of her career.

References

External links
 ITF tournament edition details
 Tournament draws

Wismilak International
Commonwealth Bank Tennis Classic
1994 in Indonesian tennis
1994 in Indonesian women's sport